How Opal Mehta Got Kissed, Got Wild, and Got a Life is a young adult novel by Kaavya Viswanathan, written just after she graduated from high school. Its 2006 debut was highly publicized while she was enrolled at Harvard University, but the book was withdrawn after it was discovered that portions had been plagiarized from several sources, including the works of Salman Rushdie and Meg Cabot. Viswanathan immediately apologized and stated that similarities were "completely unintentional and unconscious." All shelf copies of Opal Mehta were ultimately recalled and destroyed by the publisher, and Viswanathan's contract for a second book was canceled.

Book deal
While attending Bergen County Academies, Viswanathan showed her writing – including a several-hundred-page novel on Irish history she had already completed – to Katherine Cohen of IvyWise, a private college admissions consultancy which Viswanathan's parents had hired to help with their daughter's application process. Through Cohen, Viswanathan was signed by the William Morris Agency under senior agent and William Morris partner Jennifer Rudolph Walsh and referred to book packaging company 17th Street Productions (now called Alloy Entertainment), a media firm responsible for packaging the Gossip Girl and The Sisterhood of the Traveling Pants book series, among others. On the basis of an outline and four chapters of the novel that would become Opal Mehta, Viswanathan eventually signed a two-book deal with Little, Brown and Company for an advance originally reported to be $500,000. She began writing the book the summer before college, and finished it during her freshman year at Harvard College, while taking a full course load. Opal Mehta was published on April 4, 2006, and Viswanathan was profiled by The New York Times on April 6, 2006.

Opal Mehta centers on an academically oriented Indian-American girl who, after being told by a Harvard College admissions officer that she is not well-rounded, doggedly works to become a typical American teen: ultrasocial, shopping- and boy-driven, and carelessly hip. With Publishers Weekly calling the book "Legally Blonde in reverse," Viswanathan stated that her own college prep experience had inspired the novel: "I was surrounded by the stereotype of high-pressure Asian and Indian families trying to get their children into Ivy League schools." When asked about her influences in an interview given to The Star-Ledger of Newark, New Jersey (before any allegations of plagiarism had surfaced), Viswanathan responded that "nothing I read gave me the inspiration" to write the novel.

Michael Pietsch later told The New York Times that Viswanathan's advance for her two-book deal was less than the previously publicized amount of $500,000, and that it was split between the author and Alloy Entertainment. Alloy President Leslie Morgenstein asserted that while the firm helped Viswanathan "conceptualize and plot the book," it did not help with the actual writing. Though Alloy was no longer involved once the book was sold to Little, Brown, the company shares the copyright with Viswanathan. Her agent Walsh told The New York Times that the plot and writing of Opal Mehta had been "1,000 percent" Viswanathan's. The novel was edited by Asya Muchnick at Little, Brown, and the movie rights to the book were sold to DreamWorks SKG in February 2006.

Opal Mehta garnered mixed reviews, many of which described Viswanathan as an author of "chick lit."

Plagiarism

Megan McCafferty
On April 23, 2006, The Harvard Crimson reported that several portions of Opal Mehta appeared to have been plagiarized from Megan McCafferty's first two "Jessica Darling" novels, Sloppy Firsts (2001) and Second Helpings (2003), noting over a dozen similar passages. At the time, Viswanathan's novel had reached 32nd on The New York Times hardcover fiction bestseller list. McCafferty's third Jessica Darling novel, Charmed Thirds, had just been released a week after Opal Mehta, and was No. 19 on the same list.

McCafferty stated that she had learned about Viswanathan's plagiarism through a fan's e-mail on April 11, 2006, the same day Charmed Thirds was released and nearly two weeks before the story went public. According to McCafferty, the email's subject read: "'Flattery or a case for litigation.' I thought, oh my God, somebody's suing me." Prompted by the email's allegations, McCafferty looked at Opal Mehta and later said that reading Viswanathan's book was like "recognizing your own child's face. My own words were just leaping out at me page after page after page." Contacted by the Crimson the day before they broke the story, McCafferty responded via email: "I'm already aware of this situation, and so is my publisher ... After reading the book in question, and finding passages, characters, and plot points in common, I do hope this can be resolved in a manner that is fair to all of the parties involved."

On April 24, 2006, Little, Brown issued a statement from Viswanathan:

"When I was in high school, I read and loved two wonderful novels by Megan McCafferty, Sloppy Firsts and Second Helpings, which spoke to me in a way few other books did. Recently, I was very surprised and upset to learn that there are similarities between some passages in my novel ... and passages in these books ... While the central stories of my book and hers are completely different, I wasn't aware of how much I may have internalized Ms. McCafferty's words. I am a huge fan of her work and can honestly say that any phrasing similarities between her works and mine were completely unintentional and unconscious. My publisher and I plan to revise my novel for future printings to eliminate any inappropriate similarities ... I sincerely apologize to Megan McCafferty and to any who feel they have been misled by these unintentional errors on my part."

Viswanathan's agent Walsh stated, "Knowing what a fine person Kaavya is, I believe any similarities were unintentional. Teenagers tend to adopt each other's language." The day after Viswanathan's admission, Steve Ross of Crown Publishing Group – a subsidiary of Random House and the publisher of Sloppy Firsts and Second Helpings – issued a statement in response:

"We find both the responses of Little Brown and their author Kaavya Viswanathan deeply troubling and disingenuous. Ms. Viswanathan's claim that similarities in her phrasing were 'unconscious' or 'unintentional' is suspect. We have documented more than forty passages from Kaavya Viswanathan's recent publication How Opal Mehta Got Kissed, Got Wild, and Got a Life that contain identical language and/or common scene or dialogue structure from Megan McCafferty's first two books, Sloppy Firsts and Second Helpings. This extensive taking from Ms. McCafferty's books is nothing less than an act of literary identity theft ... Based on the scope and character of the similarities, it is inconceivable that this was a display of youthful innocence or an unconscious or unintentional act."

Ross said later: "We all felt it was important that we come to [McCafferty's] defense and make clear that we support our author. The notion that this was accidental stretches credibility to the breaking point." McCafferty's agent Joanna Pulcini also identified 45 "strikingly similar" passages, stating via email that "Many include identical phrasing, establish primary characters, and contain shared plot developments. ... It is understandably difficult for us to accept that Ms. Viswanathan's plagiarism was 'unintentional and unconscious,' as she has claimed." Ross added that at that time, McCafferty was "devastated" by the plagiarism, feeling "like something fundamental was taken" and "not sleeping, not eating."

In an April 26, 2006 interview with The New York Times, Viswanathan suggested that some of the plagiarism may have happened because she read both of McCafferty's books multiple times and has a photographic memory. "I remember by reading," she said. "I never take notes." She added "I've never read a novel with an Indian-American protagonist ... The plot points are reflections of my own experience. I'm an Indian-American."

Sample passages

TV interview
On April 26, 2006, Viswanathan appeared on NBC's The Today Show with Katie Couric. Viswanathan maintained her innocence, saying that any and all similarities were "completely unconscious and unintentional" and that she must have "internalized [McCafferty's] words," never deliberately meaning to "take any." She maintained, "as I was writing, I genuinely believed that every single word I wrote was my own. I was so surprised and horrified when I found these similarities, when I heard about them over this weekend." Asked about the plot similarities between Opal Mehta and McCafferty's novels, Viswanathan told Couric, "I wrote about what I knew, my personal experiences. I'm an Indian-American girl who got good grades, from New Jersey, who wanted to go to an Ivy League school, and I drew upon my own experiences, upon quirks of the people around me and my culture, to create my character Opal Mehta." Viswanathan stated her intention to put an acknowledgement to McCafferty in the foreword of future printings of Opal Mehta, and said of McCafferty "I hope that she can forgive me for whatever distress I've caused her." Couric then asked, "Do you think that's realistic ... given all the controversy surrounding James Frey and his book ... Or do you think that ... they can forgive and forget?" Viswanathan responded, "I mean, that's what I'd hope that people can do. I hope that people who know me will believe that I'm telling the truth, that I've never been anything less than honest in my entire life, that I'm so horribly sorry for this mistake. But that's all it was, a completely unintentional mistake."

Additional accusations

Salman Rushdie
Within days after the story broke, Viswanathan's name became one of the most searched terms at the blog search engine Technorati, and the scandal was a popular topic for commentators at web forums from MetaFilter to Amazon.com and Gawker.com. On May 1, 2006, The New York Times ran a story giving national prominence to claims on the Sepia Mutiny blog that Viswanathan may have lifted text from Salman Rushdie's 1990 novel Haroun and the Sea of Stories.

Sophie Kinsella
On May 2, 2006, The New York Times noted "striking similarities" between passages in Opal Mehta and those in Sophie Kinsella's 2003 "chick-lit" novel Can You Keep a Secret?. Viswanathan and Little, Brown declined to comment.

Meg Cabot
On May 2, 2006, The Harvard Crimson identified passages that Viswanathan had lifted from Meg Cabot's 2000 novel The Princess Diaries. In the same article, Crimson noted that "few—if any—'chick-lit' works have ever received the level of intense scrutiny that 'Opal Mehta' is now enduring, and it is not clear whether the new allegations suggest further plagiarism, or whether Viswanathan is simply employing tropes that are widely-used in the genre."

Tanuja Desai Hidier
On April 26, 2006, Viswanathan had told The New York Times, "I've never read a novel with an Indian-American protagonist ... The plot points are reflections of my own experience. I'm an Indian-American." Subsequently, on May 3, 2006, The Harvard Independent noted three passages in Opal Mehta similar to Tanuja Desai Hidier's Born Confused (2002), another young adult novel about an Indian-American teenager in New Jersey. They cited "uncanny resemblance in imagery, sentence structure, and paragraph organization" between the two books. Hidier later stated that she had "ironically" been alerted to the allegations on the day Viswanathan was quoted in The New York Times. Hidier said:

"I was stunned to find two dozen instances of lifting from Born Confused in the Opal Mehta book ... I also drew largely from autobiography to tell the story of my 17-year-old Indian American Jersey girl, Dimple Lala. And I hadn't read any books I could recall with a South Asian American teen protagonist at that point (I wrote Born Confused in 2000/2001 and it launched in 2002). To the best of my knowledge Born Confused was the first book with a US female teen desi heroine; that was one of the reasons my publisher wanted it, and it is certainly one of the reasons I wrote it ... And so I was extremely surprised to find that the majority, though not all, of the passages in Opal Mehta taken from Born Confused are those dealing with descriptions of various aspects of South Asian culture (food, dress, locale, even memories of India, etc.) and the way that culture is expressed in America; essentially every scene of Opal Mehta that deals with any aspect of South Asian culture in more than passing detail has lifted something from Born Confused. One would think that these kinds of cultural details at least could have been drawn from Ms. Viswanathan's personal experience, given our similar cultural backgrounds (and the similar cultural backgrounds and ages of our protagonists)."

An excerpt of Born Confused had appeared in Seventeen magazine in 2002. Hidier was subsequently contacted by Viswanathan's future book packager 17th Street/Alloy, but she declined their offer to collaborate with her on an "Indian-American teen story." Hidier noted in 2006 that "several parts of this excerpt – including the opening and closing – are present and strongly echoed in the Opal Mehta book." She added that Born Confused contained many specific details from her own life which had been recycled by Viswanathan:

"It was a surreal experience for me, looking at these and the other parallel parts side by side. The feeling was almost as if someone had broken into your home – and in some ways this is what literally had happened, considering so much of Born Confused is drawn from my life (and home): The alcohol cabinet in my non-drinking household in small town Massachusetts was now in Opal's, the details of my family's two dinnertimes because of all the years of working late into the night by my father, too; my mother's food, from her mother's recipes, transplanted to Opal's table, her slinky black outfit too; my ecstatic and eye-opening discovery of Jackson Heights, Queens during an enthralled and emotional day there many years ago, suddenly turned to Edison, New Jersey ... Did [Viswanathan and/or Alloy] think you could just substitute one kind of Indian for another? A friend brought my attention to a couple observant bloggers who seemed to have caught on early to this grand error, commenting on how jarring it was to see a Gujarati/Marathi meal on a South Indian table ... and that some of the memories of India hearken back to a much older India in the Opal Mehta book (which makes sense considering the many years that separate Ms. Viswanathan and myself) – details that may have escaped a person not familiar with the culture."

Fallout and reaction
In her initial statement on April 24, 2006, Viswanathan had stated that she and the publisher would be revising the novel for future printings "to eliminate any inappropriate similarities." The same day, Michael Pietsch of Little, Brown stated, "Kaavya Viswanathan is a decent, serious, and incredibly hard-working writer and student, and I am confident that we will learn that any similarities in phrasings were unintentional." He subsequently noted that an acknowledgment to McCafferty would be added to future printings, an intention echoed by Viswanathan in her April 26, 2006 interview with Katie Couric on The Today Show. Little, Brown recalled all copies of Opal Mehta on April 27, 2006. The next day, first edition copies of the novel were priced at $80 on eBay. On May 2, 2006, after further allegations of plagiarism had come to light, Little, Brown released a statement from Pietsch saying, "Little, Brown and Company will not be publishing a revised edition of How Opal Mehta Got Kissed, Got Wild, and Got a Life by Kaavya Viswanathan, nor will we publish the second book under contract." DreamWorks had already halted development of the film adaptation in late April 2006. Harvard University said soon after controversy broke that it would not affect her academic standing there. She graduated with honors in 2008, and subsequently went to Georgetown Law School, from which she graduated in 2011, the same year her parents were killed in a small plane crash in Ohio.

On May 18, 2006, McCafferty noted, "I had heard so much about her book and I had planned on reading it [before the allegations surfaced] ... It was sad and it was a shock that it could happen on such a big scale ... This was a big book that was getting so much attention and publicity. It is the most surreal thing that's ever happened to me." Alerted to the situation two weeks before The Harvard Crimson picked up the story, she stated that "The media broke it and I was sick to my stomach ... People don't know how hard it was to have somebody else take that from me and try and profit. As someone [who has been] writing my entire life, to build my career, it almost made me lose faith in the publishing industry." Though Alloy Entertainment had previously stated that it helped Viswanathan conceptualize the book but did not help with the actual writing, McCafferty also raised the issue of their possible culpability in the scandal. As book packagers sometimes use their own staff or hire freelance writers to ghostwrite manuscripts for publishers, McCafferty asked, "Was it the book packagers who really wrote the book and plagiarized my books or was it her?"

Of Viswanathan being remembered for the scandal, McCafferty also said, "I wouldn't want to be defined by a mistake made in such a public way ... I hope she can move on from this. I hope that for both of us." In addition, she noted that "Books for teens have taken a huge beating in the media" in the aftermath of the incident. "These very elitist comments about 'how all books for teens are crap; so isn't this just crap stealing from crap'. My books are not crap." McCafferty noted that she was insulted by an opinion letter published in The New York Times in which one writer wrote that teen books are "undemanding literature for undemanding readers." "There's so much good writing for teenagers now," she said. "People make across the board judgments."

The reception and fallout from the publication of the novel was discussed by Shaleena Koruth in the 2014 book Postliberalization Indian Novels in English: Politics of Global Reception and Awards.

References

External links 

 "Publisher Bets Big on Harvard Freshman", The New York Sun, April 22, 2005.
 Geoffrey K. Pullum, "Probability Theory and Viswanathan's Plagiarism", Language Log, April 25, 2006.
 Bill Poser, "In Defense of Kaavya Viswanathan", Language Log, April 25, 2006.
 
 "Viswanathan-gate", New Yorker writer Malcolm Gladwell's personal blog, April 30, 2006
 "Inside 17th Street", The Harvard Independent, April 26, 2006.
 "A Tarnished Opal", The Harvard Crimson, April 27, 2006
 "Sophomore Novelist Admits To Borrowing Language From Earlier Books", The Harvard Crimson, April 28, 2006.
 
 In Defence of Kaavya Viswanathan at Rediff.com, May 8, 2006.
 Kurt Andersen, "Generation Xerox. Youth may not be an excuse for plagiarism. But it is an explanation", New York Magazine, May 6, 2006
 End of Kaavya, The Times of India, May 10, 2006
 
 Mark Patinkin, "How Kaavya Viswanathan got herself packaged", The Providence Journal, May 9, 2006.
 Bride of Frankenstein, LA City Beat, May 11, 2006.
 Bonnie Pfister, "Teen Author Earned Good Reputation Early", Associated Press, May 11, 2006.
 "Fingers in the word-till", Mail & Guardian, May 12, 2006.
 YRK Reddy, "Unduly battered Kaavya can still get a better life", The Financial Express, May 13, 2006.
 Jordan Bartel, "It could just be the nature of the world in which they live.", Carroll County Times, May 13, 2006.
 "Nowadays publishers are basically business people, whose primary motive is to make money.", The Tribune, May 13, 2006.
 "Kira Cochrane pities the young plagiarist", The New Statesman, May 15, 2006.
 "The Formula Book Factory", The Telegraph, May 19, 2006.
 "From young literary star to accused plagiarist", USA Today, May 7, 2006.

2006 American novels
2006 controversies in the United States
2006 debut novels
American young adult novels
Chick lit novels
Little, Brown and Company books
Novels involved in plagiarism controversies
Recalled publications
Salman Rushdie